Troncens is a commune in the Gers department of Gascony in the southwestern France.

Geography

Localisation 
Troncens is situated in the south of the department near the department of Hautes-Pyrenees.

Hydrography 
The Cabournieu, right tributary of the Bouès, has its source in the town. Another tributary (left bank) of the Bouès, the Laus, runs through the town. The farms are dispersed throughout the area.

Population

Businesses and artisans 
- Agriculture: sunflower, corn

- 1 gîte: CAP de BOUEOU  (bouéou = beef in Gascon dialect) - Vacation rental in an 18th-century farmhouse in Troncens, Gers.

See also
Communes of the Gers department

References

 Troncens on the site of the National Geographic Institute

Communes of Gers